King's-Edgehill School is a Canadian private university-preparatory boarding and day school located in the town of Windsor, Nova Scotia. It is the oldest English independent school in the Commonwealth outside the United Kingdom, founded by United Empire Loyalists as King's Collegiate School in 1788, and granted Royal Charter by King George III in 1802.

History Of King's Collegiate School

In April 1789, King George III gave Royal Assent to the establishment of King's Collegiate School, as well as to the establishment of the University of King's College—the first such honour to be bestowed upon any school in the British Empire. It is also claimed that Prince Edward, Duke of Kent took an interest in King's Collegiate School and University of King's College while stationed in Halifax as Commander-in-Chief, British North America.

The Academy at Windsor, known as the "Collegiate School",  and the "King's Collegiate School" was opened on 1 November 1788, under the charge of Mr. Archibald Payne Inglis.  Seventeen pupils were in attendance, among whom was John Inglis, subsequently the Right Rev. John Inglis, D. D. third Bishop of Nova Scotia.

In June 1890, the Anglican Diocese of Nova Scotia decided to establish a girls' school in Windsor to complement King's Collegiate School. Edgehill School opened in January 1891 and construction of a new building to house the new girls began in the following June.

In 1920, a disastrous fire swept through the campus causing irreparable damage to the main university buildings. With the encouragement of the Carnegie Foundation, which was promoting the consolidation of all Nova Scotian post-secondary institutions to Halifax around a nucleus formed by Dalhousie University, the University of King's College received funds to move into a newly built campus in Halifax. King's College remains an independent university, although its students enjoy affiliation privileges with Dalhousie. Its campus is located at the corner of Oxford Street and Coburg Road, occupying the northwest corner of Dalhousie's Studley Campus.
In 1923, the former King's College campus in Windsor was designated a National Historic Site, as it was the original site of the oldest university in the colonies which became Canada.

History of Edgehill School for Girls 
The initiatory step in the establishment of the Edgehill School for Girls was taken by the Alumni of King's College on June 25, 1890. The project was brought under the notice of the Synod of the Diocese of Nova Scotia in the address of the Bishop on June 27, 1890. The foundation of the new building was commenced on May 18, 1891.

During the Second World War, the Edgehill School was host to a group of approximately 30 female students from the Roedean School in East Sussex, England who had been evacuated. They travelled to Nova Scotia on the SS Duchess of Atholl.

On September 1, 2016, the former Edgehill School for Girls was struck by lightning. Despite the best efforts of fire crew, the ensuing fire destroyed the building.

History of King's-Edgehill School 

In 1976 the governing bodies of both schools decided to amalgamate, and King's-Edgehill School was born.

Both King's Collegiate School and the newer Edgehill School remained on the Windsor campus and eventually expanded to include much of the  site, therefore better hosting the athletic tournaments which take place every year.

King's College School (The  Collegiate School), Edgehill School for Girls, King's-Edgehill School Timeline 
 1787 - Dr. Charles Inglis arrives in Nova Scotia
 1788 - King's Collegiate School for boys opens with 17 students
 1789 - George III gives Royal Assent to K.C.S.
 1790 - The Academy commenced in the Susanna Francklyn's house.
 1794 - The Academy moved into the unfinished College buildings, which had begun its construction in 1790
 1800 - The boys of K.C.S. adopt the game of hurley to the ice of Long Pond
 1817 - Construction of The Academy building was begun, the story being that of the eight thousand pounds spent to build this stone building, three thousand is said to have come from the Arms Duty Fund raised in Castine, Maine, during the War of 1812; it was ready for use in 1822
 1822 - New Stone Structure was completed for the Academy on the College Property. 
 1863 - Convocation Hall is built, Canada's first library museum building
 1867 - Canadian Confederation: Among the Fathers of Confederation are 3 former K.C.S. students
 1871 - Fire destroyed The Academy (Willetts House - Lower School)
 1877 - The boys’ school moved into a new wooden building constructed on the site of the stone building and was designated King's Collegiate School
 1877 - Hensley Memorial Chapel opens on the first Sunday of Michaelmas Term
 1891 - Edgehill School for Girls opens with 27 resident and 15 day students
 1905 - Because of poor drainage, the school was moved to higher ground.
1906 - Cadet Programme Begins.  Cadet Corp #254
 1915 - The School changed its name to King's College School
 1920 - Disastrous fire destroys the main buildings of the University of King's College
 1923 - The school and the university separate; King's College moves to Halifax
 1931 - Inglis House is erected on the foundation of the original 1790 College building
 1976 - Amalgamation to form King's-Edgehill School
 1981 - King's-Edgehill offers the International Baccalaureate Programme, the sixth school in Canada to do so
2005 - New construction:  The Ted Canavan Athletic Centre, The David K. Wilson Gymnasium and The Spafford Pool. 
2006 - The opening of The Fountain Performing Arts Centre
2018 - FIFA Regulation Turf Field Installed on Jakeman Field.

Present day
Since 2005, there have been major renovations of the school, ranging from the addition of a floor to the girls dormitory to the construction of the Ted Canavan Athletic Centre, complete with a pool, double gym and well-equipped exercise facilities, the opening of The Fountain Performing Arts Centre to host musical performances, concerts and dance productions and the most recent addition to the campus, the all weather artificial turf field and running track.

The current headmaster is Joseph F. Seagram. His predecessor is  David Penaluna, KES headmaster from 1995-2008.

Headmasters and Principals (King's)

Headmistresses/Principals Edgehill School for Girls (Founded 1891)

Notable alumni

Teachers
 Sir Charles G. D. Roberts
 Steven Holmes
 Steven Laffoley
 Graham Day

Students

 David Andrews
 Ruth Archibald
 Robert Christie (Quebec Politician)
 George Cooper, C.M., C.D., Q.C.
Bruce Curtis
 Amor De Cosmos
 Muriel Denison
 Robert B. Dickey
 Dorothy Harley Eber
 Fred Fountain
 Joan Fraser
 James Gilbert
 John Hamilton Gray (New Brunswick politician)
 Tiny Hermann
 Gudie Hutchings
 Frederick E. Hyndman
 Andrew Kam
 Basil King
 Leopold David Lewis
 A.A. MacLeod
 Percy Paris
 John Pryor
 Joe Robertson (ice hockey)
 Edward Ross
 Joachim Stroink
 Thomas Suther
 Gordon Tidman 
 Peter Whalley
 Austin Willis
 Evan Xie

See also
 Memory NS - Edgehill Fond
 Royal eponyms in Canada
 Education in Canada
 History of Nova Scotia

References

Hockey Heritage Centre funding announced

External links

Preparatory schools in Nova Scotia
Boarding schools in Nova Scotia
Private schools in Nova Scotia
High schools in Nova Scotia
International Baccalaureate schools in Nova Scotia
Educational institutions established in 1788
1788 establishments in Nova Scotia
Schools in Hants County, Nova Scotia
Burned buildings and structures in Canada
Schools with a royal charter